Baumea laxa is a flowering plant in the sedge family, Cyperaceae, that is native to Western Australia. 

The grass-like plant is found along coastal areas in the Peel, South West, and Great Southern regions where it grows in damp sandy soils.

References

laxa
Plants described in 1874
Flora of Western Australia